Carajás may refer to:
 Carajás Mine
 Carajás Airport
 Canaã dos Carajás
 Eldorado dos Carajás
 Carajás (proposed Brazilian state)
 Carajas (spider)
 Karajá or Carajás, an indigenous tribe of Brazil
 Gurgel Carajás, a large SUV produced in Brazil